Poltoranin is a Russian masculine surname, its feminine counterpart is Poltoranina. It may refer to
Alexey Poltoranin (born 1987), Kazakh cross-country skier
Olga Poltoranina (born 1987), Kazakhstani biathlete, wife of Alexey 
Mikhail Poltoranin (born 1939), Russian journalist and politician

Russian-language surnames